The Barnes Akathisia Scale (commonly known as BAS or BARS) is a rating scale that is administered by physicians and other healthcare professionals to assess the severity of drug-induced akathisia. The Barnes Akathisia Scale is the most widely used rating scale for akathisia. This scale includes objective and subjective items such as the level of the patient's restlessness.

See also
 Diagnostic classification and rating scales used in psychiatry

References

Medical scales
Mental disorders screening and assessment tools